James Emilius Broome (December 15, 1808 – November 23, 1883) was an American politician who was the third Governor of Florida.

Early life and career 

Broome was born in Hamburg, South Carolina and moved to Florida in 1837. He engaged in the mercantile business until he retired in 1841. In that same year, Governor Richard Keith Call appointed him to the position of Probate Judge of Leon County. He served in that position until 1848.

Political life 

He was elected governor in 1852. A Democrat, he took office on October 3, 1853. He was an early States'-Righter. During his term, the Whig Party, the opposition to the Democrats at the time, controlled the Florida State Legislature. He vetoed so many of the bills that were passed by the legislature that he became known as the "Veto Governor". His gubernatorial stint ended on October 5, 1857. Broome served as a member of the Florida Senate in 1861. A large planter, he was very sympathetic to the Confederate cause.

Marriages 

James E. Broome was married five times.  In 1865, he moved to New York City. On a visit with his son in DeLand, Florida, Broome died in 1883.

References

External links
Official Governor's portrait and biography from the State of Florida

Governors of Florida
Florida Democrats
1808 births
1883 deaths
Democratic Party governors of Florida
People from Hamburg, South Carolina
People from Leon County, Florida
19th-century American politicians
American planters
American slave owners
American merchants
19th-century American judges
Whig Party (United States) politicians
Politicians from New York City
States' rights